This is a list of finalists for the 2014 Archibald Prize for portraiture. As the images are copyrighted, an external link to an image has been listed where available (listed is Artist – Title).

Abdul Abdullah – I wanted to paint him as a mountain (Portrait of Richard Bell)
Michael Bales – Butchered (Self-portrait)
Mike Barnard – You beautiful fighter (Portrait of his mother Judy)
Phillip Barnes – Anna Meares
Jason Benjamin – I just wanna dream (Portrait of Tim Rogers)
Kate Beynon – Sangeeta and Fuji (Portrait of Sangeeta Sandrasegar)
Natasha Bieniek – Isola (Self-portrait)
Joanna Braithwaite – Bright spark (Portrait of Colleen McCullough)
Jandamarra Cadd – Proud (Portrait of Archie Roach)
Mitch Cairns – Reg Richardson AM
Eliza Cameron – Nice shootin' cowboy (Portrait of Anson Cameron)
Peter Churcher – Four self-portraits in a bunch of balloons (Self-portrait)
Samuel Rush Condon – What I would look like if I was John Safran (Portrait of John Safran)
Peter Daverington – The Golden City has ceased (Self-portrait)
Anh Do – Father (Portrait of his father Tam Do)
Michael Fairweather – Camilla (Portrait of Camilla Rountree)
Vincent Fantauzzo – All that's good in me (self-portrait as son Luca) (Portrait of his son Luca) (Winner of the People's Choice Award 2014) (Image)
Carla Fletcher – Dan Sultan
Juan Ford – Channelling WC Piguenit, startled by a spectacular sunset viewed through a canopy (part tribute to William Charles Piguenit, part self-portrait)
Joe Furlonger – Self-portrait at Moree (Self-portrait)
David Griggs – Not a sexpat idiot cowboy painting (Self-portrait)
Rebecca Hastings – The onesie (Self-portrait)
Sophia Hewson – Artist kisses subject (Self-portrait with Missy Higgins)
Alan Jones – Adam (Portrait of Adam Goodes)
Dapeng Liu – Portrait of Cao Yin on blue-and-green landscape (Portrait of Cao Yin)
Fiona Lowry – Penelope Seidler (Winner of the Archibald Prize 2014) (Image)
Mathew Lynn – Swing (after Fragonard, portrait of Ken Unsworth)
Tim Maguire – Cate, take 1 / Cate, take 2 (Portrait of Cate Blanchett)
Paul Mallam – The card player (Self-portrait)
Bridgette McNab – Grace (Portrait of Grace Hellyer)
Julian Meagher – John Waters – the clouds will cloud (Portrait of John Waters)
Andrew Mezei – Morpheus (Portrait of Kate Leslie)
Paul S Miller – Greg (Greg Warburton)
Paul Newton – Portrait of Frank Lowy AC
Mia Oatley – Real thing (Portrait of Tim Maguire)
Nicolee Payne – Fuifui Moimoi
Jason Phu – Evan on a Sunday morning at the gallery having a ginger tea with some old fat snoring man and some lady pushing someone's annoying crying baby around in a blue pram, and no, you can't smoke here mate (Portrait of Evan Hughes)
Evert Ploeg – John Schaeffer AO – art collector and philanthropist
Rodney Pople – Well dressed for a Sydney audience (Portrait of Barry Humphries)
James Powditch – Citizen Kave (Portrait of Nick Cave)
Troy Quinliven – Thinking of the next move (Portrait of Rodney Pople)
Jude Rae – Sarah Peirse
Sally Ross – Harvey (Portrait of Harvey Miller AO)
Paul Ryan – Rox (Portrait of Richard Roxburgh)
Wendy Sharpe – Mr Ash Flanders, actor
Mariola Smarzak – Wendy (Portrait of Wendy Arnold)
Tim Storrier – The Member, Dr Sir Leslie Colin Patterson KCB AO (portrait of Sir Les Patterson) (Winner of the Packing Room Prize 2014) (Image)
Martin Tighe – A familiar stranger (Portrait of Emma Ayers)
Mirra Whale – Tom Uren
Lee Wise – Zavros (Portrait of Michael Zavros)
Heidi Yardley – Julia deVille
Zoë Young – Torah Bright
Qiang Zhang – Here (Portrait of Yang Li)
Salvatore Zofrea – Ms Gladys Berejiklian MP

See also 
Previous year: List of Archibald Prize 2013 finalists
Next year: List of Archibald Prize 2015 finalists
List of Archibald Prize winners

External links
Archibald Prize 2014 finalists official website

2014
Archibald
Archibald
Archibald Prize 2014
Archibald Prize 2014
Archibald